Beautiful Lies is a novel by bestselling author Lisa Unger. It is the first book featuring Ridley Jones. Crown Publishing Group published the novel in June 2006 and it became an instant New York Times Best Seller the week it was released.

Awards and honors
Beautiful Lies was selected as a Doubleday bookclub International Book of the Month. It was also chosen in 21st place in the top 50 "Best Books of 2006" by the editors of Amazon.com, a BookSense pick
 and a finalist in the International Thriller Writers Organization "Best Novel" Award in 2007.

References

2006 American novels
American crime novels
Novels set in New York City
Novels by Lisa Unger
Shaye Areheart Books books